The Battle of Steen's Mountain was a battle during the Snake War.  In response to Paiute attacks in Idaho, Lt. Col. George Crook led a punitive expedition into southeast Oregon, defeating Chief Howluck at the Battle of Owyhee River.  Continuing his pursuit, Crook again encountered the Chief Paunina's Paiute village at Steen's Mountain.  As Crook ordered the charge, his horse bolted and carried him through the native village.  Nevertheless, his men followed.  Despite several close calls for Crook personally, his troopers' fire was accurate and inflicted heavy casualties.  A month later Crook's men engaged in one final skirmish before Crook ended the expedition due to bad weather.

Notes

References

 The Snake War, 1864-1868, Idaho State Historical Society Reference Series #236, 1966

Steen's Mountain
1867 in Oregon
Steen's Mountain
Steens
Steen's Mountain